The Heritage Party (also known as Warisan Malaysia or Warisan) is a multi-racial political party in Malaysia which was rebranded and renamed from the Sabah Heritage Party, a Sabah-based party led by Shafie Apdal formed earlier on 17 October 2016 after its expansion into national level politics at the end of 2021.

History
The party formed an electoral allies with Pakatan Harapan (PH) in the 2018 general election (GE14). Its President Shafie Apdal promised that the party would be represented within the federal cabinet if PH was elected to power. adding that through the electoral pact they will "only work together, not joining the PH pact as their party will only contest in Sabah". The party became part of the ruling bloc and federal government when PH won the 2018 general election but left the coalition in April 2021, 13 months after the Pakatan Harapan coalition was ousted from government.

During the 2020 Sabah state election, the state ruling party was defeated by the informal Gabungan Rakyat Sabah state opposition coalition consisting of the federal ruling Perikatan Nasional, Barisan Nasional and United Sabah Party. Warisan failed to secure a simple majority to retain the state power, allowing the GRS coalition to form a new state government.

Following the 2020 election, Warisan became the largest opposition party of the State Legislative Assembly and the Chief Minister before state election and its President Shafie Apdal became the new state Leader of the Opposition after being ousted in the state election. At its annual general meeting on 12 December 2020, members voted in favour of elevating the party from a state to a national party, as a way forward to integrate East Malaysia into decision-making for the entire nation. Following this announcement, the party was renamed the Heritage Party (Parti Warisan).

Warisan officially began its expansion into Peninsula Malaysia on 17 December 2021 with the launch of its peninsula chapter, which would be collaborating with MUDA.  At the same event, the party leader also hinted that a Peninsula Malaysian assemblyperson would be joining the party. Eventually, on 22 January 2022, Bryan Lai Wai Chong, the Selangor assemblyman for Teratai joined the party to become its first peninsula assemblyperson, followed two days later by Danny Law Heng Kiang from DAP Penang and Jelutong MP Jeff Ooi. In February 2022, UMNO's former Kukup assemblyman Suhaimi Salleh joined the party to be its Johor state elections coordinator for the upcoming 12 March elections.

On 15 February 2022, Warisan announced that they would contest in the 2022 Johor state election as a test for their support in the Peninsula. Besides their Johor coordinator, ex-UMNO assemblyman Suhaimi Salleh, Warisan recruited former Malaysian Indian Congress (MIC) Central Working Committee (CWC) member Datuk Seri S. Sunther - son of ex-MIC Vice President Datuk Seri S. Subramaniam and former GERAKAN Johor Women's Chief Wong Siew Poh to assist Suhaimi in the election.  Eventually, candidates from Warisan contested in 6 of the 56 state assembly seats on offer, but failed to win any.

Leadership structure 
 President :
 Shafie Apdal
 Deputy President :
 Ignatius Dorell Leiking
 Vice-President :
 Jaujan Sambakong
 Junz Wong
 Terence Siambun
 Secretary-General :
 Loretto Damien S. Padua Jr
 Secretary-Executive :
 Aliasgar Basri
 Information Chief :
 Azis Jamman
 Treasurer-General :
 Vacant
  Wanita Chief :
 Norfaizah Chua (Acting)
 Wira Chief :
 Ismail Ayob
 Wirawati Chief :
 Isnaraissah Munirah Majilis
 Supreme Council Members :
 Daud Yusof
 Mudi Dubing
 Ahmad Hassan
 Mohd Zinin Adong Ajak
 Mazliwati Abdul Malek Chua
 Honorsius Bosuin
 Azhar Matussin
 Charles Ebbie
 Ma'mun Sulaiman
 Ahmad Shah Tambakau
 Sarifuddin Hata
 Arunarnsin Taib
 Japar Awang
 Mahadi Mumin
 Nicholas Chak
 Aidi Moktar
 Mohd Taib Isai
 Rozman Isli
 Assaffal Samsul Kamal
 Calvin Chong Ket Kiun
 Justin Wong Yung Bin
 Siti Aminah
 Jenifer Lasimbang
 Aziz Taib
 National Coordinator :
 Dr Rajiv Bhanot
 State Coordinator :
 Perlis : Abdul A'zib Saad
 Kedah : Fadzil Hanafi
 Kelantan :   Khairul Azuan Kamaruddin
 Penang : Jeff Ooi
 Perak : Sunther Subramaniam
 Selangor : Lai Wai Chong
 Negeri Sembilan : Azman Idriz
 Melaka : Ng Choon Koon
 Johor  : Suhaimi Salleh
 Labuan  : Rozman Isli

Elected representatives

Dewan Negara (Senate)

Senators 

 His Majesty's appointee:

Dewan Rakyat (House of Representatives) 

Warisan has 3 MPs in the House of Representatives.

Dewan Undangan Negeri (State Legislative Assembly) 

Sabah State Legislative Assembly 
Selangor State Legislative Assembly

General election results

State election results

Notes

References

External links 
 
 

Political parties in Sabah
2016 establishments in Malaysia
Political parties established in 2016